The Last Federation is an indie strategy video game developed by Arcen Games, LLC, released on Microsoft Windows on April 18, 2014.

Gameplay 
The goal of The Last Federation is to unite various alien species in a single federation, in order to prevent future wars, genocides, or other disasters. The player-character is the last survivor of a race of alien hydras (the same character "Hydral" would later show up in Starward Rogue), who flies around in a single spaceship going between planets and events in space, occasionally getting into a dogfight with other ships.

Combat is performed in turn-based 2.5-second intervals, before which you distribute power between weapons, shields, and engines, each of which has different effects on the fight.

Reception 

Rowan Kaiser of IGN said that "there’s a lot to like about The Last Federation" but "its strategy can’t keep up with its strong tactics", giving the game a 6.9/10.

References

External links
 Official website
 Official soundtrack at Bandcamp

2014 video games
Linux games
MacOS games
Windows games
Strategy video games
Video games developed in the United States